Glauser is a surname. People with this surname or its variants include:

 Calvin Henry Glauser (1923–2007), Canadian bank employee and political figure in Saskatchewan
 Elisabeth Glauser (born 1943), Swiss operatic mezzo-soprano and academic voice teacher
 Friedrich Glauser (1896–1938), Swiss writer
 Hansruedi Glauser (1945–2014), Swiss chess master
 Laura Glauser (born 1993), French handballer in the French national team
 Nelly Glauser (born 1966), Swiss long-distance runner
 Tamy Glauser (born 1985), Swiss model 

Surnames